Northeast Somerset is an unorganized territory in Somerset County, Maine, United States. The population was 367 at the 2020 census.

Geography
According to the United States Census Bureau, the unorganized territory has a total area of 1,349.5 km2 (521.0 mi2).  1,256.9 km2 (485.3 mi2) of it is land and 92.6 km2 (35.8 mi2) of it (6.86%) is water.

Townships
The territory consists of 14 townships plus three townships shared with Seboomook Lake and two townships shared with Northwest Somerset.

17 townships can be listed as follows:

 Mayfield 
 Bald Mountain 
 East Moxie 
 Square Town 
 Moxie Gore 
 Indian Stream EKR 
 Chase Stream WKR 
 Johnson Mountain 
 Parlin Pond 
 Misery Township
 Sapling 
 Long Pond 
 Sandwich Academy Grant 
 Taunton & Raynham Academy Grant
 Rockwood Strip (T1 R1)
 Rockwood Strip (T2 R2) 
 Misery Gore

Demographics

As of the census of 2000, there were 354 people, 165 households, and 99 families residing in the unorganized territory.  The population density was 0.3/km2 (0.7/mi2).  There were 1,062 housing units at an average density of 0.8/km2 (2.2/mi2).  The racial makeup of the unorganized territory was 96.61% White, 2.82% Native American, and 0.56% from two or more races. Hispanic or Latino of any race were 0.28% of the population.

There were 165 households, out of which 23.6% had children under the age of 18 living with them, 52.1% were married couples living together, 4.2% had a female householder with no husband present, and 39.4% were non-families. 31.5% of all households were made up of individuals, and 12.1% had someone living alone who was 65 years of age or older.  The average household size was 2.15 and the average family size was 2.64.

In the unorganized territory the population was spread out, with 21.5% under the age of 18, 2.3% from 18 to 24, 29.4% from 25 to 44, 33.1% from 45 to 64, and 13.8% who were 65 years of age or older.  The median age was 44 years. For every 100 females, there were 119.9 males.  For every 100 females age 18 and over, there were 109.0 males.

The median income for a household in the unorganized territory was $20,917, and the median income for a family was $31,250. Males had a median income of $26,806 versus $17,750 for females. The per capita income for the unorganized territory was $14,520.  About 22.1% of families and 22.1% of the population were below the poverty line, including 22.7% of those under age 18 and 19.0% of those age 65 or over.

References

Unorganized territories in Maine
Populated places in Somerset County, Maine